Anthony David Woodworth (born 5 March 1968) is an English former professional footballer who played as a goalkeeper. Born in Manchester, he joined the youth team at Burnley in 1984 and was promoted to the senior squad in December 1986. Woodworth made his only first-team appearance for Burnley in the 0–6 home defeat to Hereford United on 24 January 1987, deputising for the unavailable Joe Neenan. He was released in the summer of 1987 and subsequently moved into amateur football with Burnley United of the West Lancashire Football League.

References

1968 births
Living people
Footballers from Manchester
English footballers
Association football goalkeepers
Burnley F.C. players
English Football League players